IN, In or in may refer to:

Places 
 India (country code IN)
 Indiana, United States (postal code IN)
 Ingolstadt, Germany (license plate code IN)
 In, Russia, a town in the Jewish Autonomous Oblast

Businesses and organizations
 Independent Network, a UK-based political association
 Indiana Northeastern Railroad (Association of American Railroads reporting mark)
 Indian Navy, a part of the India military
 Infantry, the branch of a military force that fights on foot
 IN Groupe , the producer of French official documents
 MAT Macedonian Airlines (IATA designator IN)
 Nam Air (IATA designator IN)

Science and technology
 .in, the internet top-level domain of India
 Inch (in), a unit of length
 Indium, symbol In, a chemical element
 Intelligent Network, a telecommunication network standard
 Intra-nasal (insufflation), a method of administrating some medications and vaccines
 Integrase, a retroviral enzyme

Other uses
 In (album), by the Outsiders, 1967
 In (Korean name), a family name and an element in given names
 "In", an episode of Minder
 Imperishable Night, the eighth official game in the Japanese Touhou series
 Indonesian language (former ISO 639-1 language code; "id" used since November 3, 1989)
 In Nomine, a title given to any of numerous short pieces of English polyphonic instrumental or vocal music during the 16th and 17th centuries

See also 
 Inn (disambiguation)
 INS